Forrest is a small hamlet situated in the Rural Municipality of Elton, Manitoba, Canada. In the 2001 census the municipality had a population of around 1,337.

Forrest was first established in the early 1880s, at the time of the western railroad was completed. It was named for W. H. Forrest, official receiver for the Great North West Central who later became Government Inspector of Railways.

Forrest has two businesses, Mad Dog Ice Cream (in an old Brandon transit bus) and The Bend in the Willow tea house. It also hosts a farmers market throughout the summer months. Northeast of the hamlet along Justice Road is a bed and breakfast called the Elton Heritage House.

Forrest is also home to the Forrest United Church, Elton Collegiate, and Forrest Elementary School.

Unincorporated communities in Westman Region